Vakhtang Tchutchunashvili (died 1668) was a Georgian nobleman who ruled the crown of Imereti, western Georgia, in the years of 1660–1661 and 1668. 

In 1660, the Queen Dowager Darejan, the widow of Alexander III of Imereti, deposed and blinded her stepson, the legitimate king Bagrat V.  Darejan then married Tchutchunashvili, a petty noble, whom she installed as king of Imereti. Deposed by Prince Vameq III Dadiani of Mingrelia and other nobles with Ottoman support, Darejan and Vakhtang fled to Akhaltsikhe, in the Ottoman-held Georgian province. Tchutchunashvili was restored by the pasha of Akhaltsikhe in 1668. According to various accounts, he was murdered with his wife Darejan at the palace of Kutaisi.

References 

 Вахушти Багратиони (Vakhushti Bagrationi) (1745). История Царства Грузинского: Жизнь Имерети.
David Marshall Lang, The Last Years of the Georgian Monarchy, 1658-1832. New York: Columbia University Press, 1957. 

1647 births
1668 deaths
Nobility of Georgia (country)
Kings of Imereti
17th-century people from Georgia (country)
Eastern Orthodox monarchs